Kevin Falcon (born 1963) is a Canadian financial executive and a provincial politician who is the leader of the British Columbia Liberal Party as of 2022, and the Leader of the Opposition as of May 2022. He is the member of the Legislative Assembly (MLA) for the district of Vancouver-Quilchena, being elected in a byelection in April 2022. He formerly served as the MLA for Surrey-Cloverdale as a member of the BC Liberals from 2001 to 2013. He served as both the 12th deputy premier of British Columbia, and the province's minister of Finance. On April 30, he was elected as MLA for Vancouver-Quilchena in a by-election.

Personal life  
Born in North Vancouver, British Columbia, Falcon worked in insurance after graduating from a private Catholic high school Vancouver College. Falcon holds a Bachelor of Arts degree from Simon Fraser University (SFU).  He lives in North Vancouver with his wife Jessica and daughters Josephine and Rose.

Early political career (1980s–2013) 
After being involved with the Social Credit (Socred) party in the 1980s, Falcon decided to study political science at SFU. He was a member of the Young Socreds on campus while future Premier Christy Clark was also at SFU.

After graduation, he was part of a movement to revitalize the right-wing municipal party in Surrey that saw Doug McCallum upset incumbent mayor Bob Bose of the NDP-affiliated Surrey Civic Electors party in 1996 and the election to council of future mayor Dianne Watts.

Falcon then set up a communications consultancy (Access Group) in 1998. His major step into provincial politics was as a lead organizer of the "Total Recall" effort to recall a number of BC New Democratic Party MLA's in 1999.

After replacing incumbent Bonnie McKinnon as the Liberal nominee, he was first elected in 2001 as a BC Liberal to represent the riding of Surrey-Cloverdale, and re-elected in the 2005, and 2009 elections.

His first cabinet appointment was in the newly created position of Minister of State for Deregulation which earned kudos from business and industry for cutting government 'red tape.' In January 2004, after police "raided" the legislature to investigate corruption in the sale of BC Rail, Falcon replaced Judith Reid as Minister of Transportation and Infrastructure.

As transport minister, Falcon changed the governance structure of TransLink to reduce the oversight by municipal representatives. He also introduced the Gateway Program, a $3 billion regional transportation strategy for Metro Vancouver that launched the construction of the new Port Mann Bridge.

In June 2009, Falcon was appointed as Minister of Health.

On November 3, 2010, Premier Gordon Campbell announced that he would step down as Premier of British Columbia once his successor was chosen. On November 30, 2010, Falcon launched his campaign for the 2011 BC Liberal Party leadership.

On December 11, the Vancouver Sun reported that Falcon's social media traffic was the highest of declared candidates. Falcon's leadership campaign focused on “returning BC to a fiscally responsible path” in the aftermath of the global economic crisis.

On February 26, 2011, Falcon narrowly lost his bid to become the Liberal leader, and the province's Premier, to Christy Clark by a margin of 52%-48% in the third round of voting by party members.

Christy Clark, the new Premier, included Falcon in her new cabinet by appointing him as Minister of Finance and Deputy Premier. In August 2012, expecting the birth of his second daughter Rose, Falcon indicated he would not run in the 2013 election.

Break from politics (2013–2021)
After leaving the legislature, Falcon joined Vancouver-based Anthem Capital as their Executive Vice President. Additionally, Falcon took on a number of volunteer roles with non-profit organizations including the Canuck Place Foundation, Lions Gate Hospital Foundation and the Streetohome Foundation. He was also named as an honorary director of the Surrey Board of Trade.

Return to politics (2021–present) 
BC Liberal Leader Andrew Wilkinson announced his resignation on October 26, 2020. He officially resigned on February 17, 2021, triggering a year-long BC Liberal leadership race.  Falcon officially joined the race a month later. In his launch speech, Falcon committed to renaming the BC Liberal Party in consultation with members to better reflect the party's values.

On October 31, 2021, Diamond Isinger, campaign manager for fellow leadership candidate Michael Lee, shared a statement about an "incident of sexual & personal harassment" with a Falcon campaign staffer. Insinger said she went public with her allegations "due to the lack of action taken" after addressing her concerns privately with the Falcon campaign. Falcon fired the staffer the day after Isinger's statement.

Falcon won the leadership on February 5, 2022, crossing the 50% threshold required to win on the fifth ballot. Following Falcon's win, Andrew Wilkinson formally resigned as an MLA to free up his seat in Vancouver-Quilchena for Falcon to run. A by-election for the riding was called on April 2, 2022. Falcon won the byelection, being elected MLA for the riding.

See also
British Columbia Liberal Party
2022 British Columbia Liberal Party leadership election

References

External links
 Official Biography, Legislative Assembly of British Columbia

1963 births
Living people
Businesspeople from British Columbia
British Columbia Liberal Party MLAs
Finance ministers of British Columbia
Health ministers of British Columbia
Canadian financial businesspeople
Canadian real estate businesspeople
Deputy premiers of British Columbia
Members of the Executive Council of British Columbia
People from North Vancouver
People from Surrey, British Columbia
Simon Fraser University alumni
21st-century Canadian politicians